Robert Wagner (born 14 July 2003) is a German professional footballer who plays as a midfielder for Bundesliga club SC Freiburg.

Career
Born in Lahr, Wagner began playing football as a six-year-old with local club SC Lahr. A few years later, he briefly joined SC Freiburg before returning to SC Lahr. He re-signed with SC Freiburg at U15 level.

In the 2021–22 season Wagner made 26 appearances in the 3. Liga for SC Freiburg II, scoring twice and making two assists. In the first half of 2022 he made the first team's Bundesliga squad on four occasions. Ahead of the 2022–23 season, he trained with the first team in pre-season making his debut in a friendly against Rayo Vallecano.

Career statistics

Club

Honours
Individual
Fritz Walter Medal U19 Bronze: 2022

References

External links
 
 
 

 

2003 births
Living people
People from Lahr
Sportspeople from Freiburg (region)
German footballers
Footballers from Baden-Württemberg
Association football midfielders
Germany youth international footballers
3. Liga players
SC Freiburg players
SC Freiburg II players